Mayanot Institute of Jewish Studies (Hebrew: מעיינות, lit. Wellsprings), is a school in Jerusalem for Jewish students aged 16–29. Classes include instruction in Jewish Mysticism, Philosophy, Talmud, Torah, Chassidut, and the Hebrew Language. The Mayanot Men's Program was founded in 1996, the Women's Program started in 2008, the Post High School program started in 2016, and the amazing Zal Program started in 2022.

Administration
 Rabbi Kasriel Shemtov - Executive Director
 Rabbi Shlomo Gestetner - Dean
 Rabbi Yisroel Noach Wichnin - Rosh Yeshiva
Rivka Marga Gestetner - Director of Education for the Women's Learning Program 
Rabbi Shneur Broh - Director of the Post High School Program (for men)
 Rabbi Yossi Shemtov - Director of the Zal Program

Location

The men's campus is centrally located in Jerusalem. It is within walking distance to the Kotel and the Jerusalem Central Bus Station. The men's campus is a few blocks away from Mahane Yehuda Market, also known as "the shuk". The women's campus is in the Rechavia neighborhood in Jerusalem.

Learning style
Mayanot strives to accommodate Jews from all types of backgrounds. Talmud study is broken down into eight levels of study. The goal is to take students from learning the Hebrew alphabet to learning a section of Gemara on their own within 24 months. This unique method of Talmud study is fast gaining international recognition. Yeshivas in Europe, Australia, and America have written to Mayanot asking staff members to conduct in-service programs for their teachers, so that they may
implement the methodology in their own classrooms. Rabbi Baruch Kaplan traveled to Australia where he trained several teachers at a college of Jewish Studies.

Students have a choice of learning options from classroom to chavruta style learning:
Yeshiva students prepare for and review the shiur with their chavruta during a study session known as a seder. In contrast to conventional classroom learning, in which a teacher lectures to the student and the student repeats the information back in tests, chavruta-style learning challenges the student to analyze and explain the material, point out the errors in his partner's reasoning, and question and sharpen each other's ideas, often arriving at entirely new insights of the meaning of the text.

Accreditation
Mayanot Institute of Jewish Studies is an accredited institution of MASA, a joint project of the Jewish Agency and the government of Israel. The school advises students who wish to obtain credit for their courses at Mayanot  to consult with their school's admissions office to arrange the transfer of credits in advance.

Scholarship fund
One of the donors to the yeshiva is the Schottenstein family. They have donated to the men's dorms and the program in general. They are quoted as saying, [it was a] "thrill to support" Mayanot, and it was, for him, "a 'blue chip investment'".

Ben Federman and David Schottenstein together with his wife Eda partnered on a joint philanthropic project to launch the Mayanot Institute of Jewish Studies Midwest Scholarship Fund. The Schottenstein family supports a number of key projects at Mayanot, including the "Saul’s Scholars" summer program scholarship, dedicated by  William and Thomas Schottenstein in the memory of  their late uncle, Saul Schottenstein.

Birthright Israel: Mayanot
Since 2000, Mayanot’s Birthright Israel division has brought over 40,000 participants on life-changing trips to Israel, successfully connecting North American youth with their Judaism. Long-recognized as a popular choice for college students, Birthright Israel: Mayanot offers high-quality Israel experiences in 10 activity-packed days. Highlights of Mayanot's trips include: hiking Masada, floating in the Dead Sea and Shabbat at the Western Wall.

Notable alumni
 Sammy Harkham - cartoonist 
 Simcha Weinstein - the "Comic Book Rabbi"

References

External links
 Mayanot official website
 Birthright Israel: Mayanot official website

Baalei teshuva institutions
Chabad in Israel
Chabad yeshivas
Hasidic Judaism in Jerusalem
Orthodox yeshivas in Jerusalem
Orthodox Jewish schools for women